is a train station in Ube, Yamaguchi Prefecture, Japan owned and operated by the West Japan Railway Company.

Lines
West Japan Railway Company
Ube Line

References 

Railway stations in Japan opened in 1925
Railway stations in Yamaguchi Prefecture